This is a list of methylphenidate (MPH or MPD) analogues, or Phenidates. The most well known compound from this family, methylphenidate, is widely prescribed around the world for the treatment of attention deficit hyperactivity disorder (ADHD) and certain other indications. Several other derivatives including rimiterol, phacetoperane and pipradrol also have more limited medical application. A rather larger number of these compounds have been sold in recent years as designer drugs, either as quasi-legal substitutes for illicit stimulants such as methamphetamine or cocaine, or as purported "study drugs" or nootropics.

More structurally diverse compounds such as Desoxypipradrol (and thus Pipradrol, including such derivatives as AL-1095, Diphemethoxidine, SCH-5472 and D2PM), and even mefloquine, 2-benzylpiperidine, rimiterol, enpiroline and DMBMPP, can also be considered structurally related, with the former ones also functionally so, as loosely analogous compounds. The acyl group has sometimes been replaced with similar length ketones to increase duration. Alternatively, the methoxycarbonyl has in some cases been replaced with an alkyl group.

Dozens more phenidates and related compounds are known from the academic and patent literature, and molecular modelling and receptor binding studies have established that the aryl and acyl substituents in the phenidate series are functionally identical to the aryl and acyl groups in the phenyltropane series of drugs, suggesting that the central core of these molecules is primarily acting merely as a scaffold to correctly orientate the binding groups, and for each of the hundreds of phenyltropanes that are known, there may be a phenidate equivalent with a comparable activity profile. Albeit with the respective difference in their entropy of binding: cocaine being —5.6 kcal/mol & methylphenidate being —25.5 kcal/mol (Δs°, measured using [³H]GBR 1278 @ 25 °C)

Notable phenidate derivatives

Isomerism

Methylphenidate (and its derivatives) have two chiral centers, meaning that it, and each of its analogues, have four possible enantiomers, each with differing pharmacokinetics and receptor binding profiles. In practice methylphenidate is most commonly used as pairs of diastereomers rather than isolated single enantiomers or a mixture of all four isomers. Forms include the racemate, the enantiopure (dextro or levo) of its stereoisomers; erythro or threo (either + or -) among its diastereoisomers, the chiral isomers S,S; S,R/R,S or R,R and, lastly, the isomeric conformers (which are not absolute) of either its anti- or gauche- rotamer. The variant with optimized efficacy is not the usually attested generic or common pharmaceutical brands (e.g. Ritalin, Daytrana etc.) but the (R,R)-dextro-(+)-threo-anti (sold as Focalin), which has a binding profile on par with or better than that of cocaine. (Note however the measure of fivefold (5×) discrepancy in the entropy of binding at their presumed shared target binding site, which may account for the higher abuse potential of cocaine over methylphenidate despite affinity for associating; i.e the latter dissociates more readily once bound despite efficacy for binding.) Furthermore, the energy to change between its two rotamers involves the stabilizing of the hydrogen bond between the protonated amine (of an 8.5 pKa) with the ester carbonyl resulting in reduced instances of "gauche—gauche" interactions via its favoring for activity the "anti"-conformer for putative homergic-psychostimulating pharmacokinetic properties, postulating that one inherent conformational isomer ("anti") is necessitated for the activity of the threo diastereoisomer.

Also of note is that methylphenidate in demethylated form is acidic; a metabolite (and precursor) known as ritalinic acid. This gives the potential to yield a conjugate salt form effectively protonated by a salt nearly chemically duplicate/identical to its own structure; creating a "methylphenidate ritalinate".

Receptor binding profiles of selected methylphenidate analogues

Aryl substitutions

Both analogues 374 & 375 displayed higher potency than methylphenidate at DAT. In further comparison, 375 (the 2-naphthyl) was additionally two & a half times more potent than 374 (the 1-naphthyl isomer).

Aryl exchanged analogues

Piperidine nitrogen methylated phenyl-substituted variants

Cycloalkane extensions, contractions & modified derivatives

Azido-iodo-N-benzyl analogues
Structures of Azido-iodo-N-benzyl analogues of methylphenidate with affinities.

ɑp <0.05 versus Ki of (±)—threo-methylphenidate.
bp <0.05 versus IC50 of (±)—threo-methylphenidate.
cp <0.05 versus its corresponding Ki.

Alkyl substituted-carbomethoxy analogues

ɑH = Equivalent overlay of structure sharing functional group
bCO2CH3 (i.e. COOCH3) = Equivalent overlay of structure sharing functional group
cCH3 = Equivalent overlay of structure sharing functional group
dpossible typographical error in original source; e.g. 2,100 ± 900 or 900 ± 210

Restricted rotational analogs of methylphenidate (quinolizidines)
Two of the compounds tested, the weakest two @ DAT & second to the final two on the table below, were designed to elucidate the necessity of both constrained rings in the efficacy of the below series of compounds at binding by removing one or the other of the two rings in their entirety. The first of the two retain the original piperidine ring had with methylphenidate but has the constrained B ring that is common to the restricted rotational analogues thereof removed. The one below lacks the piperdine ring native to methylphenidate but keeps the ring that hindered the flexibility of the original MPH conformation. Though their potency at binding is weak in comparison to the series, with the potency shared being approximately equal between the two; the latter compound (the one more nearly resembling the substrate class of dopaminergic releasing agents similar to phenmetrazine) is 8.3-fold more potent @ DA uptake.

ɑCompounds tested as hydroclhoride (HCl) salts, unless otherwise noted.
b% inhibition caused by 5μM
c% inhibition caused by 10μM, as assayed by SRI
dTested as free base
eAssayed by SRI (appropriate correction factor applied.)
f% inhibition of 10μM compound.
gValues expressed as x ± SEM of 2—5 replicate tests. (If no SEM shown, value is for an n of 1.)
hNot determined
icf. phenmetrazine & derivatives

Various MPH congener affinity values inclusive of norepinephrine & serotonin
Values for dl-threo-methylphenidate derivatives are the mean (s.d.) of 3—6 determinations, or are the mean of duplicate determinations. Values of other compounds are the mean—s.d. for 3—4 determinations where indicated, or are results of single experiments which agree with the literature. All binding experiments were done in triplicate.

ɑDenotes that preparation of membrane and results extrapolated therefrom originated from frozen tissue, which is known to change results when interpreting against fresh tissue experiments.

p-hydroxymethylphenidate displays low brain penetrability, ascribed to its phenolic hydroxyl group undergoing ionization at physiological pH.

See also 

List of modafinil analogues
List of cocaine analogues
Substituted cathinone

References

Notes

Further reading 

 
 
 
 
 
 
 
 
 

Dopamine reuptake inhibitors
Norepinephrine–dopamine reuptake inhibitors
Carboxylate esters
Methyl esters
Methylphenidate
Piperidines
Sigma agonists
Sympathomimetic amines
Designer drugs
Chemical classes of psychoactive drugs